Clive Walter Swift (9 February 1936 – 1 February 2019) was an English actor and songwriter. A classically trained actor, his stage work included performances with the Royal Shakespeare Company, but he was best known to television viewers for his role as Richard Bucket in the BBC sitcom Keeping Up Appearances. He played many other television and film roles.

Life and career
Swift was born in Liverpool on 9 February 1936, the son of Abram Sampson Swift, who owned a furniture shop in Bootle, and Lily Rebecca, née Greenman. His elder brother David was also an actor. Both were educated at Clifton College and Gonville and Caius College, Cambridge, where Clive read English literature. He was previously a teacher at LAMDA and the Royal Academy of Dramatic Art. His family was Jewish.

He appeared as Snug in the Royal Shakespeare Company's 1968 film production of A Midsummer Night's Dream as part of a cast that included Diana Rigg, Helen Mirren and Ian Richardson. During the 1970s, he appeared as Doctor Black in two of the BBC's M. R. James adaptations: The Stalls of Barchester and in A Warning to the Curious, as well as the BBC adaptation of The Barchester Chronicles. He is best known for his role on Keeping Up Appearances as Richard Bucket, the long-suffering husband of Hyacinth. Swift made two appearances in Doctor Who, in the 1985 story Revelation of the Daleks and the 2007 Christmas special. Around the time of his second appearance, he gave a "grumpy" interview to Doctor Who Magazine in which he bemoaned "not getting paid" to promote his episode, and belittled the show. He also played Sir Ector, the adoptive father of King Arthur in John Boorman's 1981 film Excalibur.

In addition to acting, he was a songwriter. Many of his songs were included in his shows Richard Bucket Overflows: An Audience with Clive Swift, which toured the UK in 2007, and Clive Swift Entertains, in which he performed his own music and lyrics, which toured the UK in 2009. He also played the part of the Reverend Eustacius Brewer in Born and Bred, which aired on BBC One from 2002 to 2005. His last performance was in an episode of Midsomer Murders in 2017, after which he retired.

Personal life and death
Swift was married to novelist Margaret Drabble from 1960 until their divorce in 1975. He was the father of one daughter, Rebecca (who died in April 2017), known for running The Literary Consultancy in London, and two sons, Adam Swift, an academic, and Joe Swift, a garden designer, journalist and television presenter.

Swift died at home on 1 February 2019, just eight days prior of his 83rd birthday, following a short illness.  Paying tribute to Swift, fellow actor James Dreyfus said he "loved this extremely talented, subtle actor". His Keeping Up Appearances co-star Patricia Routledge said: "Clive was a skillful and inventive actor with wide experience, as his successful career proved," and that she was very sad to hear of her former co-star's death.

Filmography

Film

Television

Radio
Oblomov as the Doctor (2005)
The Right Time (2008)

Measure for Measure as Escalus (2004)
Jorrocks's Jaunts and Jollities as Nash (2011)
The Price of Fear – Remains to be Seen as Fred Treiber (2012)
 "Vivat Rex" as Lord Talbot in "Henry VI" by William Shakespeare, in episodes 15–16, BBC (1977)

Stage
Cymbeline (1962) as Cloten
The Physicists (1963) as Inspector Richard Voss (Aldwych Theatre)
The Tempest (1966) as Caliban (Prospect Theatre Company)

References

External links
Clive Swift at the British Film Institute

Clive Swift (Aveleyman)
Obituary at Bbc.co.uk

1936 births
2019 deaths
20th-century English male actors
21st-century English male actors
Alumni of Gonville and Caius College, Cambridge
British Jews
British male comedy actors
English male film actors
English male radio actors
English male Shakespearean actors
English male stage actors
English male television actors
Horizon (British TV series)
Male actors from Liverpool
Jewish English male actors
People educated at Clifton College
Royal Shakespeare Company members
Clive